Sammy Dalzell (2 June 1933 – 29 November 1977) was an Irish weightlifter. He competed in the men's featherweight event at the 1960 Summer Olympics.

References

External links
 

1933 births
1977 deaths
Irish male weightlifters
Olympic weightlifters of Ireland
Weightlifters at the 1960 Summer Olympics
Sportspeople from Belfast